The Sentinel is a print weekly and digital daily newspaper serving the city of Aurora, Colorado and the surrounding region. It is publishes each Thursday and as Sentinel Colorado and is online seven days a week. The Sentinel focuses on the issues, events and people in Greater Aurora and the surrounding region. The Sentinel covers local, regional and national politics, arts, entertainment, prep sports, government, police and topical stories. It is published by Aurora Media Group LLC.

History
In 1971, the Minneapolis Star and Tribune Company acquired a group of suburban publications in the Denver area, including the Aurora Star-Sentinel, the successor to an earlier newspaper serving the Aurora community, The Aurora Democrats and News.

Published on Wednesdays and delivered by paper delivery, The Sentinel also had a Friday companion newspaper for some time called the Aurora Sentinel Weekender.

In 1991, the Cowles Media Company (formerly Minneapolis Star and Tribune Company) broke up and sold off the Denver suburban chain. Local ownership and control of the Sentinel was established via a partnership including publisher Karen Sowell Johnson and president H. Harrison Cochran.

In 1997, a free, rack-distributed publication – The Aurora Sun-Sentinel – was introduced to supplement the paid-subscription Sentinel.

In April 2004, Aurora Publishing Co. introduced The Aurora Daily Sun, a five-day-a-week, tabloid-size publication freely distributed in the city. In June 2007, the Daily Sun adopted the Sentinel brand. In February 2011, Aurora Media Group bought the papers.

In February 2011, the Aurora Sentinel and the Buckley Guardian were purchased by the Aurora Media Group from the Aurora Publishing Company. In May 2011, the Aurora Sentinel changed from a daily to a weekly publication.

From 2013 to 2017 Aurora Media Group published Aurora a monthly city magazine showcasing the community.

In 2016 the Buckley Guardian ceased publication.

In February 2018 the Aurora Sentinel rebranded as Sentinel Colorado, evolving much like the region it serves. Readers continue to count on  award-winning local, political, regional and sports coverage throughout greater Aurora and every expanding through the region and state. Memberships now include the Association of Alternative Newspapers in addition to Colorado Press Association and the Associated Press.

References

External links
 www.sentinelcolorado.com
https://www.sentinelcolorado.com/0trending/sentinel-colorado-takes-top-colorado-public-service-honor-and-others-during-annual-ap-awards/
https://www.sentinelcolorado.com/news/aurora-sentinel-staff-win-12-awards-colorado-press-association-honors/

Newspapers published in Colorado
Weekly newspapers published in the United States
Sentinel